The Upper Dauphin Area School District is a small, rural, public school district located in Dauphin County, Pennsylvania. It is fragmented in four discontinuous pieces, including: the boroughs of Lykens, Elizabethville, Gratz, Berrysburg, and Pillow, as well as Jefferson Township, Washington Township, Mifflin Township, and Lykens Township. According to 2007 local census data, it serves a resident population of 9,723 people. By 2010, the district's population was 9,759 people. The educational attainment levels for the district's population aged 25 years and over were 81.4% high school graduates and 10.6% college graduates.

According to the Pennsylvania Budget and Policy Center, 38% of the district's pupils lived at 185% or below the Federal Poverty level as shown by their eligibility for the federal free or reduced price school meal programs in 2012. In 2009, the district residents' per capita income was $18,098, while the median family income was $45,231. In Dauphin County, the median household income was $52,371. In the Commonwealth of Pennsylvania, the median family income was $49,501 and the United States median family income was $49,445, in 2010.

Upper Dauphin Area School District operates three schools: Upper Dauphin Area Elementary School, Upper Dauphin Area Middle School, and Upper Dauphin Area High School.

Extracurriculars
Upper Dauphin Area School District offers a wide variety of clubs, activities and sports.

Sports
The district funds:

Boys
Baseball - AA
Basketball- AA
Football - A
Soccer - A
Track and field AA
 Wrestling  - AA

Girls
Basketball - A
Cheer - AAAA (added 2013)
Soccer - A
Softball - AA
Track and field - AA
Volleyball - A

Middle school sports

Boys
Basketball
Wrestling 

Girls
Basketball

According to PIAA directory July 2012

References

School districts in Dauphin County, Pennsylvania
Susquehanna Valley